Michael Atul D'Rozario (11 November 1925 – 24 February 2016) was a Roman Catholic bishop. Ordained to the priesthood on 6 June 1953, D'Rozario was consecrated bishop for the Diocese of Khulna, Bangladesh (at the time in East Pakistan) on 13 December 1970, serving until 2005.

Notes

1925 births
2016 deaths
20th-century Roman Catholic bishops in Bangladesh
Academic staff of Notre Dame College, Dhaka
Congregation of Holy Cross bishops
21st-century Roman Catholic bishops in Bangladesh
Roman Catholic bishops of Khulna